The eastern banded catshark (Atelomycterus marnkalha) is a species of catshark, and part of the family Scyliorhinidae. It is found along the northeastern coast of Australia.

References

Atelomycterus
Fish described in 2007